= Autovía A-496 =

Highway in Andalusia, Spain

The Autovía A-496 is a highway in Spain. It passes through Andalusia.
